Bruce Thornton is a classicist.

Bruce Thornton may also refer to:
Bruce Thornton (defensive lineman) (born 1958), American football player 
Bruce Thornton (cornerback) (born 1980), American football cornerback